Li Song (active 1190–1230) was a Chinese imperial court painter in the Song Dynasty.

Song was born in Qian Tang (錢塘 - present day Hangzhou). He was originally a carpenter by trade, but was later adopted and trained by the court painter Li Congxun (李從訓). He was known for painting human figures.

Notes

References
Barnhart, R. M. et al. (1997). Three thousand years of Chinese painting. New Haven, Yale University Press. 
Ci hai bian ji wei yuan hui (辞海编辑委员会). Ci hai (辞海). Shanghai: Shanghai ci shu chu ban she (上海辞书出版社), 1979.

External links
Sung and Yuan paintings, an exhibition catalog from The Metropolitan Museum of Art Libraries (fully available online as PDF), which contains material on Li Song (see list of paintings)

Year of birth unknown
Year of death unknown
12th-century Chinese painters
13th-century Chinese painters
Artists from Hangzhou
Court painters
Painters from Zhejiang
Song dynasty painters